Tall Zari or Tol Zari or Tol-e Zari may refer to:
 Tol Zari, Fars
 Tall Zari, Kohgiluyeh and Boyer-Ahmad